Abbaszadeh is a surname. Notable people with the surname include:

Mahdi Abbaszadeh, Iranian philosopher and professor
Maleyka Abbaszadeh (born 1953), Azerbaijani politician
Mohammad Abbaszadeh (born 1990), Iranian footballer

Surnames of Iranian origin